Stagonosporopsis trachelii (syn. Ascochyta bohemica) is a fungal plant pathogen that causes Ascochyta leaf spot in Campanula species.

References

External links 
 Index Fungorum
 USDA ARS Fungal Database

Fungal plant pathogens and diseases
Eudicot diseases
bohemica
Fungi described in 1895